Alfred Letourneur (born 25 July 1907 in Amiens, France and died 4 January 1975 in New York City) was a French professional cyclist. He is known for setting the motor-paced world speed record.  He was professional cyclist from  1928 to 1942. His nickname was "le diable rouge".

Achievements

From 1930 to 1938 he reached 20 victories on the "six-day racing" races in the United States and Canada.
He also had 4 victories in National Championship, United States, in years 1932, 1933, 1934 and 1935.

On 22 October 1938, Alfred Letourneur was able to beat the motor-paced world speed record on a bicycle, reaching 147.058 km/h at a velodrome in Montlhéry, France, riding behind a motorbike.  On 17 May 1941 he broke the record again, reaching 175.29 km/h (108.92 mph) on a Schwinn bicycle riding behind a specially equipped midget racer, on old highway 99 near Bakersfield, California.

See also
 Cycling records

References 

French male cyclists
1907 births
Sportspeople from Amiens
1975 deaths
Cyclists from Hauts-de-France